Weleminsky is a German-language surname. Alternative spellings include Welleminsky and  Velemínský (the Czech language variant, for which the female equivalent is Velemínská). The name may refer to:
 Friedrich Weleminsky (1868–1945), German-speaking physician and scientist from Prague who, in the early 20th century, created an alternative treatment for tuberculosis, tuberculomucin Weleminsky
 Jenny Weleminsky (née Elbogen; 1882–1957), German-speaking Esperantist and translator from Austria
 Jiří Velemínský (1933–2008), pioneering Czech plant geneticist
 Judy Weleminsky (born 1950), British charity chief executive 

Czech-language surnames
German-language surnames
Jewish surnames